Goro is a  traditional Norwegian sweet bread. 

Goro are pressed flat and commonly flavored with cardamom. It is a cross between a cookie, a  cracker, and a waffle.  Goros are made from a mixture consisting of eggs, sugar, cream, fat (butter or lard), flour and spices, baked in a special Goro iron (Gorojern). Goro cookies forms an important part of the cuisine associated with the Norwegian Christmas celebration.

References

Sweet breads
Norwegian cuisine